This is a list of mosques, hospitals, schools and other structures throughout the world that are constructed/owned by the Ahmadiyya Muslim Community, arranged according to their respective countries. Additional information pertaining to the countries is also included. As of 2009, the Ahmadiyya Muslim Community has built over 15,055 mosques, 510 schools, and over 30 hospitals. The Ahmadiyya Muslim Community is established in 206 countries of the world.

Asia
The Ahmadiyya Muslim Community originated in India in 1889, with the birth of the Community taking place in Qadian, India.  the Ahmadiyya Muslim Community has been established in all Asian countries except for Tajikistan, Turkmenistan (established 2010), Georgia and North Korea.

Pakistan

Rabwah

The Ahmadiyya Muslim Community established itself  in Rabwah on September 30, 1948. Rabwah was a town founded and created from scratch by the Ahmadiyya Muslim Community in the time of its Second Caliph, Mirza Basheer-ud-Din Mahmood Ahmad and was named ‘Rabwah’ by the Ahmadiyya Missionary Jalal-ud-Din Shams (the author of the famous book “Where Did Jesus Die?” and companion of Mirza Ghulam Ahmad) because ‘rabwah’ in Arabic means ‘elevated/exalted place’ and thus, Jalal-ud-Din Shams coined for the town Rabwah because of the narration in the Qur’an of Jesus being exalted/elevated towards God. Rabwah acted as the International Headquarters of the Ahmadiyya Muslim Community after the Partition of India and before the migration of the Fourth Caliph of the Ahmadiyya Muslim Community, Mirza Tahir Ahmad to Europe in London, England, due to the government of Pakistan’s on-going Anti-Ahmadiyya laws. England is the present location of the International administrative Headquarters of the Ahmadiyya Muslim Community.
 Bahishti Maqbarah (Ahmadiyya Graveyard).
 Jamia Ahmadiyya (Date?)
 Tahir Heart Institute.
 Fazl-e-Omar Hospital (Fazle Umar).
 Khilafat Library.
 Masjid-e-Aqsa which is the largest mosque of Ahmadiyya Muslim Community in Pakistan
 Masjid Mehdi.
 Yadgar Medhi. marks the location where Khalifa-tul-Masih II of the Ahmadiyya Muslim Community first offered prayers upon arrival to Rabwah from Qadian, India.
 Hasan Iqbal Mosque.
 Construction of Fazle Umar Hospital 1956
 13 mosques torched, destroyed or forcibly occupied in 1974.
 20 mosques demolished.
 25 mosques sealed by authorities.
 11 mosques set on fire.
 14 mosques forcibly occupied.
 35 mosques barred from construction.

Bangladesh

 The Ahmadiyya Muslim Community established itself here in 1913.
 The Bangali Ahmadiyya Community has 103 local chapters across the country, in 425 cities and villages.
 There are 65 missionaries, an MTA (Muslim Television Ahmadiyya) studio in Dhaka and a Jamia Ahmadiyya (Missionary Training College).
 Maharajpur Mosque in the Natore District
 Ahmadiyya Muslim Mosque in Khulna
 Galim Gazi Mosque in Betal, Kishoregonj
 Madaratek Mosque in Dhaka
 Masjid Baitul Baset, in Chittagong.

Bhutan

 An Ahmadiyya Muslim Mosque was constructed in Bhutan in 2008.

Cambodia

 The Ahmadiyya Muslim Community established itself here in 2001.
 At-Taqwa Mosque
 Baitul Awwal Mosque
 In 2001, the Ahmadiyya Muslim Community was introduced to a small village in Cambodia called Minchey, which is 70 km from Phnom Penh. All 252 residents of the village converted to the Ahmadiyya Muslim Community.
 Nooruddin Mosque inaugurated on March 14, 2004

India

 The Ahmadiyya Muslim Community established itself here in 1889.
 Ahmadiyya Mosque in Srinagar, Kashmir. Srinagar, Kashmir is the site of the tomb of Jesus as according to the Ahmadiyya Muslim Community
 Ahmadiyya Mosque in Simliya Ranchi, Jharkhand
 Noor Mosque in Andhra Pradesh
 Ahmadiyya Muslim Mission House in Ahmedabad, Gujarat
 Jamay Mosque, built in 2003 in Andhra Pradesh
 Ahmadiyya Muslim mission house in Udangudi, Tuticorin, Tamil Nadu 
Ahmadiyya Muslim Mission House in Kodambakkam, Chennai, Tamil Nadu
 Ahmadiyya Muslim Mission House in Adambakkam, Chennai, Tamil Nadu
 Ahmadiyya Muslim Mission House in Coimbatore, Tamil Nadu
 Ahmadiyya Muslim Mission House in Melapalayam, Tamil Nadu South Zone
 Ahmadiyya Muslim Mission House in Sattankukam, Tamil Nadu South Zone
 Ahmadiyya Muslim Mission House in Kottar, Tamil Nadu South Zone
 Ahmadiyya Muslim Mission House in Kaliyakkvilai, Tamil Nadu South Zone
 Ahmadiyya Muslim Mission House in Virdhunagar, Tamil Nadu South Zone
 Ahmadiyya Muslim Mission House in Itarsi, M.P
 Ahmadiyya Muslim Mission House in Gwalior, M.P
 Ahmadiyya Muslim Mission House in Salichoka, M.P
 Ahmadiyya Muslim Mission House in Soro, Orissa
 Ahmadiyya Muslim Mission House in Sungrah, Orissa
 Ahmadiyya Muslim Mission House in Bhadrak, Orissa
 Ahmadiyya Muslim Mission House in Bhubaneswar, Orissa
 Ahmadiyya Muslim Mission House in Cuttack, Orissa
 Ahmadiyya Muslim Mission House in Keranga, Orissa
 Ahmadiyya Muslim Mission House in Pankal, Orissa
 Ahmadiyya Muslim Mission House in Dhuan sahi, Orissa
 Ahmadiyya Muslim Mission House in Haldipada, Orissa
 Ahmadiyya Muslim Mission House in gadpada, Orissa
 Ahmadiyya Muslim Mission House in Muktadeyi Pur, Orissa
 Ahmadiyya Muslim Mission House in Ballarpur, Maharashtra
 Ahmadiyya Muslim Mission House in Shahjahanpur, Uttar Pradesh
 Ahmadiyya Muslim Mission House in Varanasi, Uttar Pradesh
 Ahmadiyya Muslim Mission House in Lucknow, Uttar Pradesh
 Ahmadiyya Muslim Mission House in Barely, Uttar Pradesh
 Ahmadiyya Muslim Mission House in Sitapur, Uttar Pradesh
 Ahmadiyya Muslim Mission House in Kanpur, Uttar Pradesh
 Ahmadiyya Muslim Mission House in Bahuwa, Uttar Pradesh
 Ahmadiyya Muslim Mission House in Udaypur Kataiya, Uttar Pradesh
 Ahmadiyya Muslim Mission House in Aroha, Uttar Pradesh
 Ahmadiyya Muslim Mission House in Agra, Uttar Pradesh
 Ahmadiyya Muslim Mission House in Saharanpur, Uttar Pradesh
 Ahmadiyya Muslim Mission House in Gonda, Uttar Pradesh
 Ahmadiyya Muslim Mission House in Dharmpur, Uttar Pradesh
 Ahmadiyya Muslim Mission House in Faizabad, Uttar Pradesh
Ahmadiyya Muslim Mosque, Rath, Uttar Pradesh

 Ahmadiyya Muslim Mission House in Patna, Bihar
 Ahmadiyya Muslim Mission House in Bhagalpur, Bihar
 Ahmadiyya Muslim Mission House in Khanpur Milki, Bihar
 Ahmadiyya Muslim Mission House in Barahpura, Bihar
 Ahmadiyya Muslim Mission House in Bhodia khera, fatehabad
 Ahmadiyya Muslim Mission House in Yadgir, Karnataka
 Ahmadiyya Muslim Mission House in Gulbarga, Karnataka
 Ahmadiyya Muslim Mission House in Jind, Haryana 
 Ahmadiyya Muslim Mission House on New Park Street in Park Circus, Kolkata.
Qadian
 The Ahmadiyya Muslim Community established itself here in 1889. Qadian was the first International Headquarters of the Community and the birthplace of Mirza Ghulam Ahmad.
 Mubarak Mosque was the first Ahmadiyya Mosque ever built, foundation stone laid in 1883 by Mirza Ghulam Ahmad.
 White Minaret, foundation stone laid on March 13, 1903, by Mirza Ghulam Ahmad; now serves as the symbol of the Ahmadiyya Muslim Community and is on the Flag of Ahmadiyyat.
Aqsa Mosque built in 1876 by Mirza Ghulam Murtaza, the father of Mirza Ghulam Ahmad.
 Bait ud Dua “House of Prayer”, the site where the founder of the Ahmadiyya Muslim Community, Mirza Ghulam Ahmad, used to offer his prayers.
 Darul Futooh “Place of Victories” Mosque.
 Nasirabad “Land of the Helper of Allah” Mosque.
 Sarae Tahir “the Tahir Inn” built as a guest house in memory of the Ahmadi Afghan martyr, Sahibzada Abdul Latif.
 The Jalsa Salana (Annual Convention) plot of land bought by the Ahmadiyya Muslim Community for the purpose.
 Founding of Madrassa Ahmadiyya founded in 1906.
 The Jamia Ahmadiyya (Missionary Training College) founded on May, 25th 1928.

Indonesia

 The Ahmadiyya Muslim Community established itself here in 1925.
 Jamia Ahmadiyya established in March 1982.

 Nasir Mosque in Indonesia
 An-Noor Mosque in Indonesia
 Ahmadiyya Muslim Community Guest Quarters and Mission House in Indonesia
 There are over 500,000 Ahmadis in Indonesia with 300 missionaries, and more than 400 local branches.
 There are 385 mosques, 174 mission houses and 36 schools built by the Ahmadiyya Muslim Community in Indonesia

Israel

 The Ahmadiyya Muslim Community established itself here in 1925 which at the time was the British Mandate of Palestine. After the UN Partition of Palestine, the community established its center in Haifa after 1947.
.
 Mahmood Mosque on Mount Carmel in Kababir, Haifa, which acts as the National Headquarters for the Ahmadiyya Community in Israel.

Japan

 The Ahmadiyya Muslim Community established itself here in 1935.
 Ahmadiyya Mission House in Nagoya
 Darul Tabligh in Tokyo
 Bait ul Ahad in Tsushima, Aichi

Kazakhstan

 The Ahmadiyya Muslim Community established itself here in 1991.
 Ahmadiyya Muslim Mission House and Mosque in Almaty

Malaysia

 The Ahmadiyya Muslim Community established itself here in 1935.
 Bait-us-Salam Mosque in Kuala Lumpur

Myanmar (Burma)

 The Ahmadiyya Muslim Community established itself here in 1935.
 Yangon Mosque in Myanmar
 Ahmadiyya Mosque in Mawlamyaing
 Ahmadiyya Mosque in Mandalay

Nepal

 An Ahmadiyya Muslim Mosque was constructed in Nepal in 2008.

Philippines

 The Ahmadiyya Muslim Community established itself here in 1985.
 Ahmadiyya Mission House in Manila
 The Philippines Ahmadiyya Community has 6 mosques, 5 mission houses, 5 local missionaries, 1 national missionary and is organized in 9 local chapters throughout the country.

Russia

 The Ahmadiyya Muslim Community established itself here in 1924.
 Ahmadiyya Mission House in St. Petersburg

Singapore

 The Ahmadiyya Muslim Community established itself here in 1935.
 Taha Mosque in Singapore
 Mirza Masroor Ahmad laid the foundation stone for a two-story mission house in 2006.

Sri Lanka

 The Ahmadiyya Muslim Community established itself here in 1915.
 Fazal Mosque in Negombo
 Bait-ul-Hamd Mosque in Colombo which acts as the national headquarters of the Ahmadiyya Muslim Community in Sri Lanka
 Ahmadiyya Muslim Centre in Slave Island
 Ahmadiyya Muslim mosque in (pasyala)

Thailand

 The Ahmadiyya Muslim Community established itself here in 1986.
 Ahmadiyya Muslim Mission House in Bangkok

Turkmenistan

 The Ahmadiyya Muslim Community established itself here in 2010.

Africa
The Ahmadiyya Muslim Community had been established in all African countries by the year 2000. The Ahmadiyya Muslim Community was introduced to Africa when several individuals living in East Africa became Ahmadis in 1900, during the life of Mirza Ghulam Ahmad.

Benin

 The Ahmadiyya Muslim Community established itself here in 1957.
 Ahmadiyya Mosque in Agonlin.
 Ahmadiyya Mosque in Togouihoue.
 Ahmadiyya Mosque in Lalo.
 Ahmadiyya Mosque in Papatia.
 Ahmadiyya Mosque in Manigri.
 Ahmadiyya Mosque in Oke-Owo
 Ahmadiyya Mosque in Godogossoun
 Ahmadiyya Mosque in Suya.
 Al-Mahdi mosque which is the largest mosque in Bénin, inaugurated April 27, 2008.
 Baitul Tauheed Mosque inaugurated in 2004.
 In 1993, 10,000 converts to the Ahmadiyya Muslim Community from Bénin.
 In 2000, 801,000 converts.
 In 2001, over 1.2 million converts, 328 local branches established within all 328 cities within the country, 228 chiefs and kings converted and 237 Sunni converted Ahmadiyya mosques along with their Imams.
 Benin has 251 Ahmadiyya mosques, 77 mission houses and over 2 million adherents of the Ahmadiyya Muslim Community. As of 2002, 57 kings of various Beninous communities joined the Ahmadiyya Muslim Community.

Burkina Faso

 The Ahmadiyya Muslim Community established itself here in 1986.
 Al Mahdi Mosque in Ouagadougou
 Ahmadiyya Muslim Mosque in Koudougou
 Ahmadiyya Islamic Radio Station established (Radio Islamique Ahmadiyya FM104.1)

Côte d'Ivoire

 The Ahmadiyya Muslim Community established itself here in 1961.
 Ahmadiyya Mosque in Dagara located in the Dabakala district of the Vallée du Bandama region.
 Ahmadiyya Mosque in Bouaké.
 Ahmadiyya Mosque in Adjamé
Ahmadiyya Mosque in San Pedro
Ahmadiyya Mosque in Abengourou
Ahmadiyya Hospital in Adjamé
Ahmadiyya Primary Schools in Ajamé and Yopougon
Ahmadiyya Mosque in Grand Bassam
Ahmadiyya Mosque in Oumé

The Gambia

 The Ahmadiyya Muslim Community established itself here in 1961.
 Ahmadiyya Mosque in Saba
 Ahmadiyya Mosque in Burock, a small village located in Foli Kansala which is one of the nine districts in the Western Division of The Gambia.
 Ahmadiyya Mosque in Latrikunda, a locale within Serrekunda, largest city in The Gambia.
 Baitus Salam Mosque in Talinding Kunjang.
 First Ahmadi Governor-General of The Gambia, Al-Haj Sir Farimang Mamadi Singateh.

Ghana

 The Ahmadiyya Muslim Community established itself here in 1921.
 Wheat grown for the first time in Ghana due to the efforts of Mirza Masroor Ahmad who was stationed in Ghana as an agriculturalist, philanthropist and the principle of the Ahmadiyya Secondary School Salaga before becoming the present Khalifah of the Ahmadiyya Muslim Community.
 Ahmadiyya Muslim Mosque in Accra
 Ahmadiyya population in Ghana increases 5 fold after one year of being established in 1921.
 Ahmadiyya Secondary Schools in Kumasi, Asokore, Fomena, Salaga, Essarkyir, Potsin and Wa.
 Nasia Mosque in northern Ghana.
 Ahmadiyya Mosque in Salaga
 Ahmadiyya Mosque in Kokobila
 Ahmadiyya Mosque in Pramso
 Nusrat Jehan Mosque in Wa
 Ahmadiyya Mosque in Techiman
 Kumasi Central Mosque in Kumasi
 Ahmadiyya Mosque in Mangoase
 Baitul Aleem Mosque in Abura
 Ahmadiyya Mosque in Daboase
 Asokore Hospital in Ashanti Region
 Baitul Habib Mosque in Kumasi
 Taleem-ul-Islam School in Kumasi, first school established in Africa by the Ahmadiyya Muslim Community
 Daboase Hospital in Daboase
 Taleem-ul-Islam School in Gomoa Poston
 Ahmadiyya Hospital in Agona Swedru
 Ahmadiyya Secondary School in Ekumfi Essarkyir
 Jamia Ahmadiyya (Missionary Training College) established in Ghana in March 1966.
 IT Institute established by Humanity First, which is affiliated by the Ahmadiyya Muslim Community in Ghana in the year 2007.
 Bustan-e-Ahmad (Gardens of Ahmad) plot of land owned by the Community for Annual Conventions, bought in 2004.
 Bagh-e-Ahmad (Gardens of Ahmad) plot of land owned by the Community for Annual Conventions, bought in 2008.
 2-5 million Ahmadis in Ghana in the year 2007.

Kenya

 The Ahmadiyya Muslim Community established itself here in 1900.
 Ahmadiyya Mosque in Nairobi
 68 Ahmadiyya Mosques throughout the country
 Ahmadiyya Hall (three-story building) inaugurated in 2005.
 Ahmadiyya Mosque in Navaisha
 Ahmadiyya Mosque in Nukoro
 Ahmadiyya Mosque in Banja
 Mission House in Eldoret
 Parklands Primary School in Nairobi

Lesotho

 The Ahmadiyya Muslim Community established itself here in 1999.
 Baitul Mahdi Mosque in Thaba-Bosiu
 There are 350 Ahmadis in Lesotho in 7 local branches.

Liberia

 The Ahmadiyya Muslim Community established itself here in 1956.
 A college professor is the first convert to the Ahmadiyya Muslim Community in 1917.
 Baitul Mujeeb Mosque in Monrovia. It was originally built in 1986 but suffered fire damage in 1996 during the First Liberian Civil War. It was reconstructed on July 7, 2000.
 Foundation stone laid for Tubmanburg Mosque in 2007
 Ahmadiyya Mission House in Gohn Town, Grand Cape Mount County
 Ahmadiyya Central Library in Monrovia inaugurated in 2008
Shah Taj Ahmadiyya Elementary, Junior & Senior High School was started in 1996 buy Mr.M.A.Bajwah ,the former Amir and Missionary In charge, Liberia with the approval of Hadhrat Mirza Tahir Ahmad , 4th Caliph of Ahmadiyya Muslim Jama'at. Mansoor Ahmad Nasir is the first principal of the school. The school is presently located in Tweh Farm, Monrovia.

Madagascar

 The Ahmadiyya Muslim Community established itself here in the 1980s.
 Baitun Nasir Mosque in Andranomadio
 Ahmadiyya Mission House in Madagascar

Mauritius

 The Ahmadiyya Muslim Community established itself here in 1913.
 Nusrat Mosque in Quatre Bornes
 Baitul Zikr Mosque in Rose-Hill
 Noor Mosque in Pailles
 Dar-us-Salam Mosque, which was the first mosque built in Mauritius and the central mosque in Rose Hill, Mauritius
 Mubarak Mosque in Montagne Blanche. It was renovated in 1961 into a concrete structure which was financed by the local Ahmadis
 Bait-us-Salam Mosque in New Grove.
 Tahir Mosque in Quartier Millitiare
 Ahmadiyya Mosque in Casernes
 Fazal Mosque in Phoenix
 Usman Mosque in Stanley
 Rizwan Mosque in St. Pierre
 Umar Mosque in Triolet
 Noor Muhammad Noroya, first Mauritian convert to the Ahmadiyya Muslim Community
 French Ahmadiyya newspaper called ‘Islamism’ established by Noor Muhammad Noroya.

Rodrigues Island
 Mahmood Mosque, La ferme
 Noor mosque, Port Mathurin

Niger

 The Ahmadiyya Muslim Community established itself here in 1956.
 Mahmood Mosque in Duobo, Niamey Region
 Noor Mosque in Algada, Marawi Region

Nigeria

 The Ahmadiyya Muslim Community established itself here in 1916.
 Baitur-Raheem Mosque in Ibadan inaugurated in 2008
 Ahmadiyya Central Mosque in Sabo Quarter, Ilaro Town, Ogun State
 Mubarak Mosque in Abuja, which is the last Ahmadiyya mosque, built in the first century of the Ahmadiyya Caliphate.
 Tahir Mosque in Ojokoro
 Ahmadiyya Mosque in Orita, Ilaro Town, Ogun State
 Owode Mosque in Ogun State
 Hadeeqa-e-Ahmad, a plot of land bought for Annual Conventions.
 Auxiliary Guest Houses in Lagos
 Ahmadiyya General Hospital in Apapa
 Ahmadiyya Muslim Weekly newspaper (first Muslim weekly newspaper in the country) called ‘The Truth’
 Jamia Ahmadiyya (Missionary Training College) in Ilaro, Ogun State
 The Qur'an translated into several Nigerian dialects, including Yoruba, Hausa, Igo, Etsako and Tiv
 Hafiz class in Nigeria (Class for the teaching of the memorization of the whole Qur’an).

Sierra Leone

 The Ahmadiyya Muslim Community established itself here in 1937.
 Ahmadiyya Mosque in Gbonkobana
 Ahmadiyya Mosque in Gbendembu
 Ahmadiyya Mosque in Kailahun
 Ahmadiyya Mosque in Makeni
 Ahmadiyya Mosque in Bo
 There are 573 mosques, 19 central missionaries, 131 local missionaries, 184 Ahmadiyya primary schools and 50 secondary schools in Sierra Leone
 Ahmadiyya Muslim Radio Station established in 2007

South Africa

 The Ahmadiyya Muslim Community established itself here in 1946.
 Baitul Awwal Mosque in Cape Town

Swaziland

 The Ahmadiyya Muslim Community established itself here in 1997.
 Baitul Hadi Mosque in Hiatikulu, which is the first Ahmadiyya mosque in Swaziland and the only mosque in the region whereupon the mosque is located in.
 There are over 250 Ahmadis in Swaziland.

Tanzania

 The Ahmadiyya Muslim Community established itself here in 1934.
 Qur'an translated into Swahili in 1936
 Ahmadiyya newspaper established in 1936 called ‘Mapenzi ya Munga’ (The Love of God).
 The first ever English language Muslim newspaper called ‘East African Times’ established by the late MM Ahmad (former vice-president of the World Bank, Pakistani civil servant, Amir of the USA Ahmadiyya Community and Amir of East African countries. He translated the Qur'an into Swahili)
 Ahmadiyya Primary School opened in 1940
 Tanzania was formerly named ‘Tangantika’. The Ahmadiyya Muslim Community was involved with the struggle of independence of the country and an Ahmadi, Mohammed Iqbal Dar, coined the name ‘Tanzania’ for the country.
 Kitonga Ahmadiyya Mosque in Dar-es-Salaam
 Salam Mosque in Dar-es-Salaam
 Baitul Hamid Mosque in Dodoma
 Fazal Mosque inaugurated in 1947 in Tabora, which is popularly known as the ‘Taj Mahal of East Africa’

Uganda

 The Ahmadiyya Muslim Community established itself here in 1935.
 Oil found in Uganda for the first time in history due to the help offered by the Ahmadiyya Muslim Community.
 Ahmadiyya Central Mosque in Kampala which has 6 minarets and can hold up to 9,000 worshippers.
 Ahmadiyya Muslim Mosque in Iganga
 There are several mosques, high schools, elementary schools in Uganda and also a hospital in the town of Mbale which has a maternity ward and modern radiology technology, established by the Ahmadiyya Muslim Community in Uganda
 Qur'an translated into the local Ugandan language.

Europe
The Ahmadiyya Muslim Community was introduced to Europe in 1907 when, in response to Mirza Ghulam Ahmad’s messages to Europe, a German woman converted to the Ahmadiyya Muslim Community. The Ahmadiyya Muslim Community is established in all European countries except for Latvia, Slovakia and Greece, though there are individual members of the Ahmadiyya Muslim Community within the latter which consist of mostly Arabs and a small number of indigenous Greeks.

Albania

 The Ahmadiyya Muslim Community established itself here in c. 1934.
 Baitul Awwal Mosque in Tirana which is one of the largest mosques in Albania.
 Darul Falah Mission House in Tirana

Austria

 The Ahmadiyya Muslim Community established itself here in c. 1936. Website: Ahmadiyya Muslim Community Austria
 Ahmadiyya Mission House in Vienna

Belgium

 The Ahmadiyya Muslim Community established itself here in c. 1982. Website: Ahmadiyya Muslim Community Belgium
 Baitul Mujeeb Mosque in Uccle inaugurated in 2020
 Baitus Salam Mosque in Dilbeek a town just outside the capital city of Brussels inaugurated in 1985
 Baitur Raheem Mosque in Alken
 Darul Tabligh Aziz in the Flemish city of Antwerp.

Bosnia and Herzegovina

 The Ahmadiyya Muslim Community established itself here in 1996.
 Baitul Islam Mosque in Sarajevo inaugurated in 2004

Denmark

 The Ahmadiyya Muslim Community established itself here in 1959.
 Nusrat Djahan Mosque in Copenhagen in 1967

Faroe Islands

 The Ahmadiyya Muslim Community established itself here in 2010.

France

 The Ahmadiyya Muslim Community established itself here in 1946. Website: Ahmadiyya Muslim Community France
 Moubarak Mosque in Saint-Prix, Allier
 Baitul Ataa Mosque in Trie-Château
 Mahdi Mosque in Hurtigheim
 Baitus Salam Mission House in Paris

Germany

 The Ahmadiyya Muslim Community established itself here in 1923 in Berlin. Website: Ahmadiyya Muslim Community Germany
 German Headquarter Baitus Sabuh
 Jamia Ahmadiyya Germany opened on 17. December 2012 by Khalifatul Masih V(atba) in Riedstadt, near the city Darmstadt.
 61 Mosques have been built in Germany as of June 2020 under the 100-Mosques-Plan.

Baden-Württemberg
 Bait-ul-Ahad Mosque in Bruchsal.
 Eshan Mosque in Mannheim.
 Baitul Baqi Mosque in Pforzheim.
 Qamar Mosque in Weil der Stadt.
 Baitul Afiyat Mosque in Waldshut-Tiengen
 Bait-ul-Jame Mosque in Offenbach am Main

Bavaria
 Gebetszentrum in Augsburg.
 Baitul Aleem Mosque in Würzburg.
 Al-Mahdi Mosque in Neufahrn bei Freising.
 Bait-un-Naseer Mosque in Augsburg

Berlin
 Khadija Mosque built in 2008 in Berlin which is the first mosque of the Ahmadiyya Muslim Community ever built in Berlin.
 Bait ul Malik Mosque in Berlin Reinickendorf.

Bremen
 Nasir Mosque in Bremen.
 Baitul Wakeel Mosque in Bremerhaven.

Hamburg
 Fazle-Omar Mosque in Hamburg which is the first mosque constructed by the Ahmadiyya Muslim Community in Germany and also the first mosque built in Germany after World War II.
 Baitur Rashid Mosque in Hamburg.

Hesse
 Noor ud Din Mosque in Darmstadt.
 Baitul Qayyum Mosque in Frankfurt
 Baitus Sabuh in Frankfurt
 Noor Mosque in Frankfurt, notable for the fact that the U.S. heavyweight boxing champion, Muhammad Ali prayed within it.
 Baitul Aafiyyat Mosque in Frankfurt
 Bait-ul-Shakoor Mosque in Groß-Gerau.
 Baitul Zafar Mosque in Immenhausen.
 Aziz Mosque in Riedstadt.
 Gebetszentrum in Schlüchtern.
 Baitul Huda Mosque built in 2004 in Usingen.
 Mahmud Mosque in Kassel.
 Bashier Mosque in Bensheim.
 Baitul Baqi Mosque in Dietzenbach.
 Baitul Ghafur Mosque in Ginsheim-Gustavsburg.
 Mahmud Mosque in Kassel.
 Baitul Aman Mosque in Nidda.
 Baitul Muqiet Mosque in Wabern.
 Baitul Wahid Mosque in Hanau
 Baitus Samad Mosque in Giessen
 Bait-ul-Ahad Mosque in Limburg an der Lahn
 Bait-ul-Hamid Mosque in Fulda
 Mubarak Mosque in Wiesbaden
 Dar-ul-Amaan Mosque in Friedberg

Lower Saxony
 Gebetszentrum in Hannover.
 Basharat Mosque in Osnabrück.
 Sami Mosque in Hannover.
 Baitul Karim Mosque in Stade.
 Nasir Mosque in Stuhr.
 Baitul Qaadir Mosque in Vechta

North Rhine-Westphalia
 Baitun Nasr Mosque in Cologne.
 Baitil Momin Mosque in Münster-Hiltrup.
 Baitul Nasir Mosque in Isselburg.
 Mansoor Mosque in Aachen
 Salam Mosque in Iserlohn

Rhineland-Palitanate
 Tahir Mosque in Koblenz
 Hamd Mosque in Wittlich

Schleswig-Holstein 
 Habib Mosque in Kiel.
 Mahdi Abad Mosque in Limburg an der Lahn.
 Bait-ul-Afiyat Mosque in Lübeck.

Ireland

 The Ahmadiyya Muslim Community established itself here in 2001. Website: Ahmadiyya Muslim Community UK & Ireland
 Maryam Mosque in Galway is the first purpose-build mosque in Galway.

Kosovo

 The Ahmadiyya Muslim Community established itself here in 1947. Website: Ahmadiyya Muslim Community Kosovo
 The Ahmadiyya Center in Prishtina

Luxembourg 

 The Ahmadiyya Muslim Community established itself here in 2012. Website: Ahmadiyya Muslim Community Luxembourg

Netherlands

 The Ahmadiyya Muslim Community established itself here in 1947. Website: Ahmadiyya Muslim Community Holland
Mubarak Mosque in The Hague was first purpose-built mosque in the Netherlands. It was inaugurated by Sir Muhammad Zafrulla Khan, an Ahmadi, who was serving as the President and Head Judge of the International Court of Justice at The Hague.
Baitun Noor Mosque Nunspeet inaugurated in 1985.
 Baitul Mahmood Mission house inaugurated in 2008.
 Baitul Afiyat Mosque in Almere inaugurated in 2019

Norway

 The Ahmadiyya Muslim Community established itself here in 1958. Website: http://www.alislam.no
 Noor Mosque in Oslo August 1, 1980
 Baitun Nasr mosque at outskirts of Oslo Norway which is the largest mosque in Scandinavia.

Poland

One of the Ahmadi representatives, Ayyaz Khan, visited Poland in 1937 to establish Ahmadiyya mission in the country. His work was disrupted by the outbreak of World War II in 1939. 60 years later, Stowarzyszenie Muzułmańskie Ahmadiyya (Ahmadiyya Muslim Community) was officially registered as an Islamic religious organisation with the government on December 3, 1990. It owns a freestanding house in Warsaw that acts as its mosque, educational center and missionary headquarters.

Portugal

 The Ahmadiyya Muslim Community established itself here in 1957.
 Ahmadiyya Mission Houses

Spain

 The Ahmadiyya Muslim Community established itself here in 1946. Website: Comunidad Ahmadía en España
Basharat Mosque (Spanish: Mezquita Basharat), which is the first mosque to be built after 750 years in Spain, built in Pedro Abad near Cordoba in 1982. 
 Baitur Rahman Mosque is the second mosque built in Spain by Ahmadiyya Muslim Community in Valencia. It was inaugurated by head of the worldwide Ahmadiyya Muslim Community Mirza Masroor Ahmad on 29 March 2013.

Sweden

 The Ahmadiyya Muslim Community established itself here in 1956.
 Nasir Mosque in Gothenburg built in 1963, inaugurated on August 20, 1976, torn and rebuilt in 2000.  
 Mahmood Mosque in Malmö finished 2016.
 Baitul Hamd Mosque in Malmö

Switzerland

 The Ahmadiyya Muslim Community established itself here in 1946.
 Mahmood Mosque built in Zürich in 1963.
 Nuur Mosque in Wigoltingen

United Kingdom

 The Ahmadiyya Muslim Community established itself here in 1912. It is the present place acting as the International Headquarters of the Community.
 Hadeeqa-tul Mahdi (Oakland Farm) is a large patch of land in Alton with a few large halls used for the Annual International Conventions of the Ahmadiyya Muslim Community which are held in the UK as that is the place of the International Headquarters of the Ahmadiyya Muslim Community.
 Islamabad, is a piece of land in Tilford, Surrey, is owned by the Ahmadiyya Muslim Community and contains the new Mubarak Mosque. As the new residence of the Supreme Worldwide Head of the community it is reminiscent of Rabwah (as they were both locations essentially pieces of land established by the Ahmadiyya Muslim Community as International Headquarters)
 Jamia Ahmadiyya (University for Religious Theology) which is located in Haslemere, Surrey. 
 Baitus Salam Mosque in Islamabad (Tilford) is now replaced by Mubarak Mosque newly built on the same site.

England 
London
 The first mosque built in London in 1924, Fazl Mosque is the only mosque to date with the distinction of being called ‘The London Mosque’ and served as the International Headquarters of the Ahmadiyya Muslim Community for 35 years up till April 2019.
 The largest mosque in Western Europe, built in 2003, Baitul Futuh Mosque “House of Victories” is located south of London in Morden, Surrey and serves as the National Headquarters of the Ahmadiyya Muslim Association UK. It broadcasts Muslim Television Ahmadiyya International as well as Voice of Islam Radio 24/7.
 Baitul Ehsan Mosque in Mitcham (It accommodates a number of national offices in a multi-storey office block)
 Baitus Subhan Mosque in Croydon
 Baitul Wahid Mosque in Feltham
 Baitul Ahad Mosque in Plaistow
 Baitul Aman Mosque in Hayes
 Darus Salaam Mosque in Southall
 Tahir Mosque in Catford
 Baitun Noor Mosque in Hounslow (327 Martindale Rd, Hounslow TW4 7HG)
 Ahmadiyya Center in Tooting
North East
 Nasir Mosque in Hartlepool
North West
Darul Aman Mosque in Manchester
Baitul Lateef Mosque in Liverpool (309 Breck Road Liverpool L5 6PU)
Baitul Rasheed Mosque in Blackburn (Pleasington House Pleasington Street Blackburn BB2 1UF)
South East
 Mubarak Mosque in Tilford
 Nasir Mosque in Gillingham
 Noor Mosque in Crawley
 Baitul Shukoor Mosque in Oxford (257 Cowley Road Oxford, OX4 1XQ)

East Midlands
Baitul Ikram Mosque in Leicester
Baitul Hafeez Mosque in Nottingham
East of England

 Baitul Mueed Islamic Centre in Cambridge (60 Mowbray Road Cambridge CB1 7SY)

West Midlands
Darul Barakaat Mosque in Birmingham opened in 2004
 Baitul Ata Mosque in Wolverhampton
 Baitul Ehsan Mosque in Leamington Spa
 Baitul Ghafoor Mosque in Halesowen
 Baitul Muqeet Mosque in Walsall

Yorkshire and the Humber
Al Mahdi Mosque in Bradford
 Baitul Hamd Mosque in Bradford
 Baitul Afiyat Mosque in Sheffield
 Baitul Tauhid Mosque Huddersfield
 Baitus Samad Mosque in Huddersfield(41 Lower Fitzwilliam St, Huddersfield HD1 6AS)
 Baitul Islam Mosque in Scunthorpe (53 Cliff Closes Road Scunthorpe DN15 7HT)
 Baitul Ata Mosque in Dewsbury (Garnett St Staincliffe Dewsbury WF13 4AT)

Scotland 

 Baitur Rahman Mosque in Glasgow

Wales 

 Ahmadiyya Mosque in Cardiff (Sanatorium Rd, Cardiff CF11 8DG)
 Baitus Sadiq in Rhyl (19a Warren Rd, Rhyl LL18 1DP)

North America

The Ahmadiyya Muslim Community was introduced to North America in 1921, with the pioneering efforts of the missionary Mufti Muhammad Sadiq. The first country to receive the Ahmadiyya Muslim Community was the United States where it appealed mainly to the African-American population though with some Caucasian converts. Many eminent jazz musicians converted to the Ahmadiyya Muslim Community like Sahib Shihab, Art Blakey (Abdullah ibn Buhaina) and Yusef Lateef.

Canada

 The Ahmadiyya Muslim Community established itself here in 1967. Website: Ahmadiyya Muslim Community Canada . It has about 50 Local Chapters scattered across the country concentrating mainly in southern Ontario. The community has a good relationship with the government and it helps in humanitarian causes regularly across the country. The community is very active in faith outreach and has held hundreds of interfaith religious events across the country as far north as Yellowknife and White Horse.

United States

 The Ahmadiyya Muslim Community established itself here in 1920. Website:www.ahmadiyya.us
 The first mosque in the nation's capital was established as the American Fazl Mosque. It served as the Headquarters of the Ahmadiyya Muslim Community from 1950 to 1994.
 Headquarters since 1994 is Baitur Rehman Mosque, Silver Spring, Maryland.

Arizona
 Yousuf Mosque in Tucson.
 The Phoenix Mosque in Phoenix

California
 Darus Salam Mosque in Bay Point.
 Baitul Hameed Mosque in Chino.
 Baitus Salam Mosque in Hawthorne.
 Bait-ul-Baseer Mosque in Milpitas (Silicon Valley).

Connecticut
 Baitul Aman Mosque.
 The Hartford Mosque in Hartford.

District of Columbia
 American Fazl Mosque in Washington, DC.

Florida
 Bait-ul-Naseer Mosque in Miami.
 Baitul-Aafiyat Mosque in Orlando, Florida

Georgia
 Bait-ul-Baqi Mosque in Norcross.

Illinois
 Al-Sadiq Mosque in Chicago which is the first mosque built in the US by the Ahmadiyya Muslim Community due to the missionary pioneering efforts of Mufti Muhammad Sadiq; thus the mosque was named after him ‘Sadiq’ (meaning ‘honest/truthful in all respects’ in Arabic).
 Van Buren Mosque in Chicago.
 Masjid Bait-ul-Jamey Mosque in Glen Ellyn.
 Zion Mission House and Mosque in Zion.

Louisiana
 Mission House in Kenner.
 Mission House in New Orleans.

Maryland
 Ahmadiyya Muslim Mission House in Baltimore.
 Baitur Rehman Mosque, Silver Spring, Maryland, which serves as the National Headquarters of the Ahmadiyya Muslim Community USA.

Massachusetts
 Mission House in Sharon (near Boston).

Michigan
 Bait-ul-Muzaffar Mosque in Detroit.
 Ahmadiyya Muslim Community Center in Rochester Hills.

Missouri
 Sadiq Mosque in St. Louis which is under construction.

New Jersey
 Bait-ul-Wahid Mosque in Clifton, New Jersey.
 Bait-ul-Hadi Mosque in Old Bridge, New Jersey.
 Bait-ul-Nasr Mosque in Willingboro, New Jersey.

New York
 Bait-ul Huda Mosque in Amityville, New York.
 Bait-ul Tahir Mosque in Brooklyn, New York.
 Bait-ul Zafar Mosque in Queens, New York.
 Baitun Naseer Mosque in Rochester, New York.
 Ahmadiyya Muslim Mosque in Albany
 Masjid Mahdi in Niagara Falls, New York.
 Masjid Bait-ul Majeed in Williamsville, New York.

North Carolina
 Ahmadiyya Muslim Mosque in Research Triangle, North Carolina.

Ohio
 Bait-ul Ahad Mosque in Bedford, Ohio.
 Fazal Mosque in Dayton, Ohio.
 Bait-ul Nasir Mosque in Groveport, Ohio, constructed in 2007.

Oregon
 Portland Rizwan Mosque in Portland, Oregon.

Pennsylvania
 Nasir Mosque in Philadelphia, Pennsylvania.
 Nur Mosque in Pittsburgh, Pennsylvania.
 Mission House in Pittsburgh, Pennsylvania.
 Noor Mosque in York, Pennsylvania.
 Hadee Mosque in Harrisburg, Pennsylvania.

Texas
 Bait-ul Ikram Mosque in Allen, Texas.
 Bait-us Samee Mosque in Houston, Texas, which is notably, the largest mosque in Texas.
 Bait-ul Muqeet Mosque in Round Rock, Texas.

Washington
 Bait-Ul-Ehsaan Mosque Monroe, WA.

Wisconsin
 Bait-ul-Qadir Mosque in Milwaukee, Wisconsin.
 Qamar Mosque (established November 28, 2010) 300 North Eagle Street Oshkosh WI 54904Oshkosh, WI.

Caribbean 
The Ahmadiyya Muslim Community was introduced to the Caribbean in the 1950s, beginning with its presence in the island nation of Trinidad and Tobago in 1952.

French Antilles

 The Ahmadiyya Muslim Community established itself here in 2002.
 Guadeloupe Mission House in Guadeloupe

Trinidad and Tobago

 The Ahmadiyya Muslim Community established itself here in 1952.
 Baitul A’ala Mosque in Caratel
 Rahim Mosque in McBean, Couva
 Baitul Aziz Mosque in the northern region of Valencia
 Ahmadiyya Anjuman Isha'at-e-Islam Inc. Trinidad and Tobago

South America
The Ahmadiyya Muslim Community was introduced to South America in the 1950s, beginning with its presence in Guyana in 1956. It is now on established in all of South America except for Paraguay, Uruguay, Chile, and Panama.

Brazil

 The Ahmadiyya Muslim Community established itself here in 1986.
 Baitul Awal Mosque in Petrópolis which is about 60 km from Rio de Janeiro
 Brazil Mosque in Brasilia

Guatemala

 The Ahmadiyya Muslim Community established itself here in 1989.
 Baitul Awal in Guatemala, inaugurated on July 3, 1989, in celebration of the centenary of the creation of the Ahmadiyya Muslim Community in 1889

Guyana

 The Ahmadiyya Muslim Community established itself here in 1956.
 Baitul Noor

Suriname

 The Ahmadiyya Muslim Community established itself here in 1956.
 Nasir Mosque in Paramaribo which is one of the largest mosques in Suriname, established in 1971.
 Nasar Mosque established in 1984.

Oceania
The Ahmadiyya Muslim Community was introduced to Oceania in the 1903. Since then, it has expanded to several island nations such as Tuvalu, the Solomon Islands, Tonga, Vanuatu, Kiribati, Nauru, Micronesia, Guam, Palau, New Zealand, and the Fiji Islands.

Australia

 The Ahmadiyya Muslim Community was introduced here around the 1903.

New South Wales 
 Baitul Huda Mosque in Sydney acts as the National Headquarters of the Ahmadiyya Muslim Community. It is one of the largest mosques in Australia and one of the first to ever be built there. September 30, 1983
 Khilafat Centenary Hall, adjacent to the Baitul Huda Mosque.
 Hassan Musa Library, within Baitul Huda Mosque, named after the first Ahmadi convert from Australia, Sufi Hassan Musa Khan, who was also a companion of Mirza Ghulam Ahmad.

Queensland 
 Baitul Masroor Mosque in Brisbane inaugurated in October 2013

South Australia 
 Masjid Mahmood was derived from an Italian soccer club in 2013. Since when it has been renovated and formed into a place of worship. Five minutes from Adelaide's CBD and Adelaide airport, the location is convenient for local members, honourable guests and visitors of the inter-state community.
 Gulshan-E-Masroor is an area of farm-land owned by the Jammat, which is located in Aldinga. The land is located at a 45 drive from Adelaide CBD and is used mainly for farming and functional purposes.

Victoria 
 Baitus Salam in Melbourne one of the largest Ahmadiyya mosque in the world; it is a totally pillarless building completed in 2011. The building was purchased in 2006.

Western Australia 
 Nasir Mosque in Bibra Lake

Fiji Islands

 The Ahmadiyya Muslim Community established itself here in 1960.

Viti Levu 
 Rizwan Mosque in Sugar City, Lautoka.
 Aqsa Mosque in Nadi.
 Mahmood Mosque in Maro
Fazle Umar Mosque in Suva which is the largest mosque in the Fiji. It can hold hundreds
 of worshippers and includes a library, community hall and other facilities.[227]

Vanua Levu 
 Aiwane Mustafa Lajna (Women's) Hall in Samabula
 Noor Mosque in Seaqaqa

Marshall Islands

 Baet-Ul-Ahad Mosque in Majuro

New Zealand

 The Ahmadiyya Muslim Community established itself here under the guidance of Khalifatul Masih IV, Mirza Tahir Ahmad in March 1987.
 Baitul Muqeet Mosque in Manukau, site was purchased in 1999. In November 2013, Khailfatul Masih V, Mirza Masroor Ahmad officially inaugurated the mosque.
 In 2010, the community opened a proper communal kitchen to serve the community and guests. This new communal kitchen (Langar Khana) of the Promised Messiah was completed in preparation for the community's Annual Convention to be held on 27–28 January 2012.

Tuvalu 

 Islam is established in Tuvalu through Ahmadiyya Muslim Community in 1985.
 Tuvalu Mosque in Funafuti is the only mosque in the country

See also

100-Mosque-Plan in Germany

References

 Ahmadiyya Muslim Mosques Around the World – A Pictorial Presentation (Khilafat Centenary Edition) by the USA Ahmadiyya Muslim Community, 
 Muslim Sunrise, Summer 2006, Second Issue of the year 2006 (quarterly magazine)

Ahmadiyya